Baghban Kalachi (also Romanized as Bāghbān Kalāchī and Bāghbān Kalācheh; also known as Bāghbān Kalā) is a village in Baraghan Rural District, Chendar District, Savojbolagh County, Alborz Province, Iran. At the 2006 census, its population was 72, in 25 families.

References 

Populated places in Savojbolagh County